Chiu I-huan  (born 15 March 1990) is a Taiwanese footballer who plays as a striker for Ming Chuan University.

References 

1990 births
Living people
Taiwanese footballers
Chinese Taipei international footballers
Association football forwards
Footballers from Taipei